Caroline Garcia was the defending champion, but she chose to participate in the Fed Cup semifinals this year.

Teliana Pereira won her first WTA title, defeating Yaroslava Shvedova in the final, 7–6(7–2), 6–1. Pereira becoming the first Brazilian to win the WTA title since Niege Dias in the 1988 Spanish Open.

Seeds

Draw

Finals

Top half

Bottom half

Qualifying

Seeds

Qualifiers

Draw

First qualifier

Second qualifier

Third qualifier

Fourth qualifier

Fifth qualifier

Sixth qualifier

References
 Main Draw
 Qualifying Draw

Copa Sony Ericsson Colsanitas - Singles
2015 Singles